Dyfri Williams (born 8 February 1952) is a British classical archaeologist. Williams received his doctorate in 1978 from Oxford University, writing on the work of the Antiphon Painter. He joined the Department of Antiquities at the British Museum in 1979. From 1993 to 2007, he was the museum's Keeper of Greek and Roman Antiquities. Since December 2007 he has been the research Keeper.

Williams' main research areas are the collections of Attic vase painting, and ancient Greek metalwork as well as questions of history. He has been a corresponding member of the German Archaeological Institute and Fellow of the Society of Antiquaries of London.

Bibliography

References

Employees of the British Museum
Fellows of the Society of Antiquaries of London
1952 births
British archaeologists
Living people
Place of birth missing (living people)